Na-rae, also spelled Na-lae, is a Korean feminine given name. Unlike most Korean names, which are composed of two Sino-Korean roots each written with one hanja, "Narae" is an indigenous Korean name: a single word meaning "wing". It is one of a number of such indigenous names which became more popular in South Korea in the late 20th century.

People
People with this name include:
 Lee Na-lae (born 1979), South Korean freestyle wrestler
 Park Na-rae, (born 1985), South Korean comedian
 Yun Na-rae (born 1997), South Korean artistic gymnast

See also
List of Korean given names

References

Given names
Korean feminine given names